Bishop Reginald Thomas Jackson (born April 26, 1954, Dover, Delaware) is the 132nd elected and consecrated bishop of the African Methodist Episcopal Church. Jackson is the husband of Christy Davis-Jackson, Esquire and the father of two children, daughter Regina Victoria Jackson and son Seth Joshua Jackson. Jackson received a bachelor's degree in history from Delaware State University (Dover, Delaware) and a Masters of Divinity from the Interdenominational Theological Center (Atlanta, Georgia).

Pastoral ministry
Jackson was assigned as the pastor of St. John AME Church, Jersey City, New Jersey, in 1979 and shortly thereafter, St. Matthew AME Church, Orange, New Jersey, in 1981. Under his ministry more than 3,000 people accepted Christ or joined the church.

As pastor of St. Matthew AME, the church developed more than thirty ministries that minister to the spiritual, emotional, educational, physical and financial needs of the church and community. Church ministries and administration are supported by a budget that has grown from $50,000 to almost $2,000,000. Because of the church's growth a new edifice was built in 1985 and a second larger edifice in 2002. Known as "The Servant Church of the Oranges", its doors are opened seven days a week and are a center of activity for church and community.

Episcopal ministry
The Rt. Rev. Reginald T. Jackson was elected and consecrated as the 132 bishop in the A.M.E. Church in 2012 at the 49th Quadrennial Session General Conference in Nashville, Tennessee. He was elected out of the First Episcopal District and stood on the platform: "Imagine the Church at Its Best" and "Strengthen Local Churches"! He currently presides over the Office of Ecumenical Affairs and is the presiding prelate of the 20th Episcopal District (Malawi, Zimbabwe) – along with Supervisor Christy Davis-Jackson.

Community impact
In addition to his pastoral and connectional church responsibilities, Jackson serves as the executive director of the Black Ministers Council (BMC) of New Jersey, which represents more than 600 African American churches in the State of New Jersey. As executive director of the BMC, he has been outspoken on almost every major issue in the state, pressuring the state to increase funding for poor (Abbott) school districts leading to the State Supreme Court to order New Jersey to spend more than eight billion dollars to achieve parity in spending, adequate funding for charity care for those who are uninsured, legislation to end predatory lending targeting minorities and seniors and development of the urban areas of the state. He is best known, however, for his leadership in the fight against racial profiling and reform of the New Jersey State Police which resulted in New Jersey passing legislation and signed by the governor making racial profiling a crime.

Affiliations and awards
Jackson serves on numerous boards. He is the chairman of the board of trustees of Essex County College, (Newark, New Jersey), member and former president of the board of education of the Orange Public Schools (Orange, New Jersey), member of the board of New Brunswick Theological Seminary (New Brunswick, New Jersey), member of the board of Barnabas Health and a life member of the NAACP. He is also a member of Phi Beta Sigma fraternity.

He is the recipient of hundreds of awards, including being named the Man of the Year in 2000 by New Jersey Monthly magazine, the recipient of the William Ashby Award by the United Way, the Martin Luther King Award by the Newark North Ward Center. Jackson has been named repeatedly among the 25 most influential people in New Jersey.

References

1954 births
Living people
African Methodist Episcopal Church clergy
American bishops